Dax McGill is a current female professional surfer from the Hawaiian island of Qahu. She has a QS ranking of 74th in the world by the Association of Surfing Professionals for 2014. She has a younger brother, Finn McGill, who is currently a junior professional surfer. She has several sponsors including T&C Hawaii, Volcom, and Electric.

In November 2014, she participated, and won the WQS Pichilemu Woman Pro 2014, held at Punta de Lobos beach, Pichilemu.

References

American surfers
1998 births
Living people
People from Oahu